Arto Nikulainen (28 August 1930 – 20 February 2010) was a Finnish rower. He competed in the men's coxless four event at the 1960 Summer Olympics.

References

External links
 

1930 births
2010 deaths
Finnish male rowers
Olympic rowers of Finland
Rowers at the 1960 Summer Olympics
People from Kaarina
Sportspeople from Southwest Finland